Fabio Kon is an ex-member of Open Source Initiative and Full Professor of the Department of Computer Science of the University of São Paulo, Brazil.  He is the primary contact for the University of São Paulo FLOSS Competence Center.

References

Year of birth missing (living people)
Living people
Brazilian computer scientists
Academic staff of the University of São Paulo
Members of the Open Source Initiative board of directors